Roopa Iyer is a film director and actor.

Career
She played the lead actress in the movie "Daatu". She directed and wrote the movie  Mukhaputa. In 2013, she directed & produced her bilingual big budget film Chandra in Kannada and Tamil.

Filmography
Note: All films are in Kannada unless otherwise noted.

References

Sources
 
 Bringing Modi on screen The Hindu

External links 
 

Female models from Karnataka
Kannada film directors
Tamil film directors
Living people
1982 births
Indian women film directors
Film directors from Karnataka
People from Mandya district
Women artists from Karnataka
Film producers from Karnataka
Kannada film producers
Kannada screenwriters
Screenwriters from Karnataka